In the post-Soviet era, Kyrgyzstan's health system has suffered increasing shortages of health professionals and medicine. Kyrgyzstan must import nearly all its pharmaceuticals. The increasing role of private health services has supplemented the deteriorating state-supported system. In the early 2000s, public expenditures on health care decreased as a percentage of total expenditures, and the ratio of population to number of doctors increased substantially, from 296 per doctor in 1996 to 355 per doctor in 2001. A national primary-care health system, the Manas Program, was adopted in 1996 to restructure the Soviet system that Kyrgyzstan inherited. The number of people participating in this program has expanded gradually, and province-level family medicine training centers now retrain medical personnel. A mandatory medical insurance fund was established in 1997.

Largely because of drug shortages, in the late 1990s and early 2000s the incidence of infectious diseases, especially tuberculosis, has increased. The major causes of death are cardiovascular and respiratory conditions. Official estimates of the incidence of human immunodeficiency virus (HIV) have been very low (830 cases were officially reported as of February 2006, but the actual number was estimated at 10 times that many). The concentration of HIV cases in Kyrgyzstan’s drug injecting and prison populations makes an increase in HIV incidence likely. More than half of the cases have been in Osh, which is on a major narcotics trafficking route.

The maternal morality rate rose by more than 15% to 62 deaths per 1000,000 births from 2008 to 2009. According to non-governmental studies, things are worse than the official data indicate.

The Human Rights Measurement Initiative finds that Kyrgyzstan is fulfilling 81.2% of what it should be fulfilling for the right to health based on its level of income. When looking at the right to health with respect to children, Kyrgyzstan achieves 98.4% of what is expected based on its current income. In regards to the right to health amongst the adult population, the country achieves only 90.3% of what is expected based on the nation's level of income.  Kyrgyzstan falls into the "very bad" category when evaluating the right to reproductive health because the nation is fulfilling only 55.0% of what the nation is expected to achieve based on the resources (income) it has available.

References